The Texas and Pacific Railway (T&P) Station was constructed in 1916 on Annunciation Street in New Orleans. The station was located between Melpomene and Thalia streets. Prior to the construction of the Huey P. Long Bridge, the trains used a railroad ferry to cross the Mississippi River into Gretna. The trains then stopped at the 4th Street station to pick up West Bank passengers before leaving town.  

The station was demolished in 1954 and replaced by the current New Orleans Union Passenger Terminal.

References

New Orelans
Transportation buildings and structures in New Orleans
Former railway stations in Louisiana
Railway stations in the United States opened in 1916
Railway stations closed in 1954
Demolished railway stations in the United States
New Orleans